"Say It Isn't So" was the third and final single to be released from Pop Idol runner-up Gareth Gates' second studio album, Go Your Own Way (2003). The single was released on 1 December 2003, peaking at number four on the UK Singles Chart. The video for the song was shot in South Africa.

Track listings
UK CD1
 "Say It Isn't So" (single mix)
 "She Doesn't Even Know"
 "Dance with Me"
 "Say It Isn't So" (video)

UK CD2 and European CD single
 "Say It Isn't So" – 4:03
 "Sunshine" (T&F vs. Moltosugo radio edit) – 3:31

German mini-CD single
 "Say It Isn't So" (single mix)
 "She Doesn't Even Know"

Charts

Weekly charts

Year-end charts

References

2003 songs
2003 singles
Gareth Gates songs
19 Recordings singles
Bertelsmann Music Group singles
RCA Records singles
Songs written by David Kreuger
Songs written by Per Magnusson
Songs written by Jörgen Elofsson